Nikola Tripković (born 28 January 1998) is a Serbian football striker who plays for FK Zlatibor.

Club career
He made his Serbian Super Liga debut with FK Borac Čačak in July 2017.

References

1998 births
People from Čačak
Living people
Serbian footballers
Association football forwards
FK Borac Čačak players
FK Polet Ljubić players
FK Spartak Subotica players
FK Smederevo players
FK Inđija players
FC Lori players
FK Budućnost Dobanovci players
Serbian SuperLiga players
Serbian First League players
Armenian Premier League players
Serbian expatriate footballers
Expatriate footballers in Armenia
Serbian expatriate sportspeople in Armenia